The Fix is a Canadian reality television series that uses home renovation pranks as a primary plot device. The series premiered on July 3, 2008, on HGTV. The program is produced by General Purpose Pictures and is hosted by contractors Neil Davies and Jay Purvis. The series also airs on the Fine Living Network in the United States.

Synopsis 
In each episode, the homeowners are introduced to Neil and Jay who gain their trust and learn of their dreams for the ultimate home renovation. After a few days of work the homeowners are then presented with a fake space. As the homeowners are brought into the fake space Neil and Jay drag the joke out until they finally reveal that the space is a fake. The hosts, with the help of a professional design team, transform the fake into the dream space for the homeowners.

References

External links 

 Fine Living Micro Site

2008 Canadian television series debuts
HGTV (Canada) original programming
2000s Canadian reality television series